Dracaena bagamoyensis, synonym Sansevieria bagamoyensis, is a succulent plant native to Kenya and Tanzania.

Description
Dracaena bagamoyensis grows long stems (over ), with slender, flat, succulent leaves.

It very closely resembles the related Dracaena arborescens, which has wider, more pliable leaves. The leaves of D. bagamoyensis are narrower (under ) and more brittle.

References

bagamoyensis
Flora of Kenya
House plants
Flora of Tanzania
Taxa named by N. E. Brown
Taxa named by James W. Byng
Taxa named by Maarten J. M. Christenhusz